This is a list of characters featured in the Telemundo-produced telenovela Aurora.

Aurora 
Aurora Ponce De León is portrayed by Sara Maldonado. She is the title character and main protagonist of the series.

Aurora is the only child of Gustavo and Inés Ponce De León. She is beautiful, passionate, generous, and loves with all her heart and soul. Though she is wealthy, she does not care much for material things. The story begins in 1990, 19-year-old Aurora is a dancer and attends New York School of the Arts with her two best friends, Natalia Suarez and Vanessa Miller. One night after a dance rehearsal, they all go to a bar, where Aurora meets the love of her life, Lorenzo Lobos, a dance instructor and single father. Aurora and Lorenzo begin a romance and fall madly in love.

Aurora keeps Lorenzo secret from her parents as she knows they wouldn't approve of her being with someone below her social class and doesn't tell Lorenzo she is wealthy because the mother of his son left them to be with a wealthy man. On the day of her twentieth birthday, Aurora decides to announce to everybody her love for Lorenzo at her birthday party. Lorenzo is invited to the party by Vanessa, who is secretly in love with him. Vanessa arranges it so Lorenzo sees a forced kiss between Aurora and Federico Álvarez de Toledo. Lorenzo misinterprets the kiss and breaks up with a devastated Aurora. Shortly after it is discovered that Aurora is pregnant with Lorenzo's baby. Her father refuses to tell Lorenzo about the pregnancy and sends her as far away from him as possible. A few months pass and Aurora tries to run away and return to Lorenzo, but she falls and goes into labor. She gives birth to a girl, who she names Blanca. Aurora becomes very ill and on her deathbed, calls Lorenzo, and says to him with her dying breath, "I will always love you." Gustavo decides to freeze Aurora in a cryogenic capsule.

Twenty years later, Gustavo discovers a cure for Aurora and wants to reanimate her. However, the medical board in his clinic votes against reanimation. Gustavo goes against the board's decision and brings Aurora back to life. The capsule had stopped her from aging, so Aurora still looks twenty years old. Lorenzo's son, Martín, sees Aurora sleeping and instantly falls in love with her. When she wakes up, she meets Martín and believes he is Lorenzo since he looks exactly like Lorenzo did twenty years ago. She is later shocked to learn he is Lorenzo's son. Aurora escapes the clinic with the help of her chauffeur, Roque, to find her true love. She sees Lorenzo through a window and is overwhelmed with emotion, but she is heartbroken when she finds out he is now married to her childhood best friend, Natalia.

When Lorenzo and Aurora finally come face to face, she runs off and he loses her. Lorenzo is told by Martín that she is not the Aurora he fell in love with twenty years ago but actually Aurora's long-lost daughter also named Aurora. Lorenzo asks Aurora if she is his daughter and she tells him she is not. Her former fiancée, Federico, agrees to pretend to be Aurora's father. From then on she is known as Aurora Álvarez de Toledo. Aurora manages to seduce Lorenzo, but as they are about to make love she becomes ill and nearly dies.

Things are further complicated for Aurora when she notices Blanca is attracted to her half-brother, Martín. When she questions Martín about his relationship with Blanca, he tells her they are just friends and that he wants to be with her. Blanca is kidnapped and Aurora goes to save her. With the help of Lorenzo and Martín, she is able to rescue Blanca, but they are all nearly killed. Aurora is horrified when she witnesses a kiss between Blanca and Martín. Aurora realizes she has to tell Blanca the truth about her paternity. Aurora tells Blanca that Martín is her brother. Blanca does not understand how this could be possible, but Aurora explains that Lorenzo is her father. When Blanca asks who her mother is, Aurora lies and tells her it's Inés.

Aurora is continually pursued by Martín. She turns him down, but she is also growing increasingly attracted to him. Gustavo is given permission to reanimate Aurora, but this proves to be a problem because he already did. Therefore, Gustavo and the other doctors at the clinic reenact a reanimation with Aurora, who now has to pretend to be two people, her true self and her daughter.

Unknowingly, Aurora is being hypnotized and manipulated by her stepmother, Elizabeth, into starting a relationship with Martín as Aurora's daughter. She also has a relationship with Lorenzo as her true self. Aurora becomes increasingly confused about who she really is and starts to believe she is the daughter she made up. She breaks up with Lorenzo because she believes she is in love with Martín.

Eventually she discovers Elizabeth's manipulations and that Vanessa is responsible for all the events that happened before her "death." Aurora confesses to everyone that there is only one Aurora, but she cannot bring herself to tell Martín. Instead, Lorenzo tells Martín that his Aurora, "Aurorita," died and he is devastated. Martin is told the truth by Vanessa and tells Aurora he wants nothing to do with her. Lorenzo and Aurora decide to live together with Blanca so they can be family, but decide it's best not to have a relationship since they don't want to hurt Martín.

One year later, Aurora and Lorenzo still maintain a platonic relationship. Aurora finds an abandoned baby named Tommy. Lorenzo and Aurora pretend to be engaged so they can adopt the baby, though it is clear they both wish it were real. Aurora desperately wants to be happy with the love of her life, but does not want to come in between father and son, or at least till she is truly forgiven by Martín and by herself.

When Aurora has a chance encounter with Martín, she is shocked by his new appearance. He tells her he is not in love with her anymore and he wants her to be with Lorenzo. Aurora asks him to come home, but he tells her he still needs time.

Aurora and Lorenzo finally reunite. They decide to marry, to the delight of their family. However, their wedding is interrupted by Federico who announces Martín is dying. Everybody rushes to Martín. After some harsh words from Federico, Aurora runs off with Tommy and her dog, Lucero. She is taken in by a woman named Pilar and her two children, Daniela and Beto. Daniela calls Aurora's apartment and is wrongly informed that they are preparing for Martín's funeral. Aurora is devastated and breaks down.

Catalina Perez-Quintana, Martín's boss, shows Aurora footage of Martín confessing that he still loves her. Once Aurora is reunited with her family, she tells Lorenzo she feels responsible for all the bad that things have happened and ends her relationship with him. Aurora begs Martín to forgive her, but he refuses and tells her to reunite with his father.

Aurora finds out she is ill due to the effects from the cryogenics, but she decides not tell anyone. Aurora and Lorenzo go on a romantic trip together and agree to split up for good when they come home. Lorenzo changes his mind and wants to get back together. Aurora realizes she should enjoy the rest of her life and reunites with Lorenzo. Daniela, who is Tommy's nanny, tells Aurora's family about her illness and they all promise to stick by her.

Tommy's biological father comes into the picture and wants custody of his son. Aurora and Lorenzo are heartbroken when they have to hand the baby over, but they feel better when they are asked to be Tommy's godparents.

Daniela confesses she is in love with Lorenzo. Aurora is kind to her at first, but quickly grows impatient. Aurora misinterprets several moments between Lorenzo and Daniela and their relationship is strained. After catching them in a hotel room together (Lorenzo believed he was meeting Aurora), she angrily kicks Lorenzo out. Eventually Daniela's manipulations are exposed and Lorenzo and Aurora agree to never let anything come between them again.

Aurora is thrilled when her beloved godmother, Pasion Urquijo, is reanimated. She later finds out that Martín is responsible for bringing Pasion back. She thanks him and Martín and Aurora finally make peace with each other. Aurora becomes friends with Christian Santana, a veterinarian who is interested in studying her dog, Lucero, who was also frozen. It is later revealed that Christian is Pasion's son, who she believed died at birth.

When Natalia is brutally raped by a group of men, Aurora is there for her. She goes undercover in a strip club to find the men responsible for the attack. Lorenzo rescues her before she is attacked by the club's owner.

Aurora and Lorenzo are thrilled when they find out she is pregnant. They get married in a private ceremony.

Eights months later, Aurora gives birth to a beautiful baby girl, who they name Aurora. Aurora's happiness has come full circle...naturally tragedy is just around the corner.

The highly anticipated musical Aurora based on her life is opening. Aurora decides to stay home with the baby. The baby becomes ill and Aurora decides to take her to the hospital. The paparazzi pursue her while she drives wanting to get a picture of her daughter. Aurora's car crashes and she is rushed to Gustavo's clinic.

Unfortunately, there is no hope for Aurora. After telling Lorenzo she wants him to move on with his life, she dies peacefully. Federico receives word of her death. He walks on stage during the performance of Aurora and announces her death. Aurora's loved ones are devastated.

Aurora had requested that her heart be donated. Martín performs the operation to remove her heart and, in another hospital, it is given to a woman named Angela Amenabar.

Martín Lobos
Martín Lobos is portrayed by Eugenio Siller. He is the other protagonist of the series.

Martín was born to young parents Lorenzo Lobos and Veronica LaSalle. His mother abandoned him and his father while he was young to be with a wealthy man. He is caring, passionate, and extremely talented. He always had an extremely close relationship with his father and is also close with his stepmother, Natalia, who he considers to be his mother, and his siblings, Nina and Cesar.

Martín gets a job as a doctor at Gustavo Ponce De León's clinic. Martín sees a young, beautiful patient sleeping and instantly falls in love with her, unaware that she is none other than his father's true love, Aurora Ponce De León. He is told a lie that she is Aurora's long-lost daughter who is also named Aurora. When he informs his father about Aurora's "daughter," Lorenzo reveals that she could be his daughter and therefore Martín's sister. Martín is relieved when it is confirmed that Aurora is not his sister.

Martín wants to be with Aurora, but she wants to be with Lorenzo, which causes major conflict between father and son. One night, while out partying, Martín has sex with a masked stripper, who turns out to be his adopted sister, Nina, who is in love with him. Nina is happy but Martín is disgusted and does not want anyone to find out.

Martín becomes close to Blanca Ponce De León, who he is unaware is his half-sister. Blanca is romantically interested in him, but he only thinks of her as a friend. When Blanca is kidnapped, Martín, Lorenzo, and Aurora manage to rescue her, though they are all nearly killed themselves. Blanca kisses Martín to thank him, which is witnessed by Aurora. So they don't commit incest, Aurora tells Blanca that Martín is her brother.

Nina drunkenly tells Lorenzo about her one night stand with Martín, which prompts Lorenzo to throw Martín out the house. Martín tells Lorenzo that he wants him to leave Aurora alone so he can be with her, but Lorenzo tells him he can't because he has fallen in love with her. Martín is relieved when Lorenzo decides to start a new life in Spain with Natalia and Cesar. However, their plane crashes and they are believed to be dead, leaving Martín devastated. Blanca finally tells Martín that they are siblings and they mourn together. Luckily, his parents and Cesar never boarded the plane and the family is reunited.

Tired of being jerked around by Aurora, Martín decides to move on. He starts seeing his friend and co-worker, Dr Liliana Rosales. To prove that Lorenzo is Blanca's father, she and Martín take a DNA test. Martín starts to pursue Aurora again, but she repeatedly turns him down, but at the same time she is also becoming increasingly attracted to him. The DNA test proves that Martín and Blanca are siblings. Martín is happy to have another sister and Blanca encourages him and Aurora to be together. Unknown to Martín and Lorenzo, Aurora takes on two identities, her true self, Aurora Ponce De León, and the daughter she supposedly had with Federico Alvarez de Toledo, Aurora Alvarez de Toledo. Aurora and Martín begin a relationship. Neither do they know that Aurora has been manipulated by her evil stepmother, Elizabeth, into starting a relationship with him.

Aurora shifts between her two identities and has relationships with Martín and Lorenzo. Martín becomes close to Lorenzo's Aurora and tries to help her adjust to twentieth century life. Martín is horrified when Lorenzo's Aurora ends their relationship because she has fallen in love with Martín. Lorenzo says it was inevitable but Martín makes is clear he has no feelings for her.

Martín is blissfully happy with his Aurora and they make plans for their future. However, Aurora starts acting strange. Martín  starts to figure out that something is wrong when he kisses Lorenzo's Aurora and realizes it is not the first time they have kissed. During all this, Martín's biological mother, Veronica, returns to his life. She is on the run from a gangster named Francisco Perez and needs help. Eventually, all of Martín's family is put in danger. Cesar ends up killing Perez in self-defense.

After discovering what Elizabeth has been doing to her, Aurora confesses to everyone that there is only one Aurora, but she cannot bring herself to tell Martín. Lorenzo tells Martín that his Aurora, "Aurorita," died and he is devastated.

Cesar is seemingly murdered by Perez's widow, Catalina Perez-Quintana. At his funeral, Vanessa Miller tells Martín that there has only ever been one Aurora. Martín is heartbroken that he was lied to by the people he loves the most and declares he hates Aurora. Martín decides he needs some space from his family to clear his head.

One year later, Martín is still heartbroken over Aurora and has barely had any contact with his family. He has changed his appearance and has turned into a bitter, angry man. To ease his pain, he has been having a casual relationship with a woman named Diana del Valle. Diana is in love with him and wants a real relationship, but Martín is only interested in the physical part. Martín has devoted most of his time to finding a cure for Vicky Hutton, who was frozen after being poisoned by Elizabeth. It is revealed that Cesar is actually alive and Martín had made an agreement with Catalina, who is Vicky's grandmother, that he would cure Vicky in exchange for Cesar's safety.

Martín and Aurora have a chance encounter at a church. Martín lies that he does not love her anymore and tells her that he can't forgive her, but he wants her and Lorenzo to be together so his beloved father can finally be happy with the woman he waited twenty years to be with. Aurora tells Martín that she cannot be happy unless he is happy but he tells her not to worry about him.

Martín gets his wish and Aurora and Lorenzo finally reunite. Through Catalina, Martín meets Perez's brother, Saverio, and Saverio's daughter, Ingrid. Ingrid is immediately attracted to Martín, but he turns her down. Ingrid agrees to leave Martin alone for good if he sleeps with her just one time, he happily agrees. When Cesar is held hostage by Saverio, Ingrid agrees to pretend to be in love with Cesar to make sure he is released safely. Ingrid comes to see Martín shortly after everything is resolved and tells him he is a lost cause when it comes to love.

Martín finds a cure for Vicky. To prove it works, Catalina tells Martín to poison himself and then take the remedy. Indifferent to the possibility he may die, Martín agrees. It appears the remedy is not working and Martín starts having convulsions and calling out Aurora's name. Federico interrupts Lorenzo and Aurora's wedding and announces that Martín is dying. Eventually the remedy does work and Martín recovers.

Catalina makes Aurora believe that Martín really is dead. A furious Martín confronts her and she pushes him into admitting that he is still in love with Aurora and that once Vicky is better, he plans on leaving and never coming back. Catalina records this conversation and shows it to Aurora, who ends her relationship with Lorenzo out of guilt. When Aurora begs Martín to forgive her, he tells her that he doesn't want anything from her and to get back together with his father.

Martín manages to revive Vicky. When Vicky wakes up, she has no memory and instantly falls in love with Martín. She repeatedly tries to seduce him but he makes it clear he wants only wants a doctor-patient relationship. Tragedy strikes when Veronica is poisoned by Elizabeth. On her deathbed she reveals a shocking secret to Martín: Lorenzo isn't his father. She had a brief affair with Lorenzo's identical twin brother, Sebastian, who is Martín's biological father. Martín is later shocked to discover that Lorenzo was once suspected of murdering Sebastian. When Martín tells Lorenzo the truth, he is devastated and refuses to believe that Martín is not his son. When Martín questions Lorenzo about Sebastian's murder, he admits that he was the last person with Sebastian, but he did not kill him. Lorenzo declares that nothing has changed for him, Martín is still his son, to which Martín agrees. Martín sees his true paternity as a good thing, because it means they are not a father and son who fell in love with the same woman.

Martín finds out that he was left a large inheritance by his maternal grandfather. The only way he can get it is if he is married. Vicky offers to marry him but he states that he never wants to get married and that his inheritance can be donated to charity.

Martín and Vicky have grown very close and its clear Martín has started to fall for her too, but he does not want a relationship. Vicky tells him she does not have any expectations he just wants to be with him. Martín tells Vicky he is never going to fall in love again because he is always going to be in love with Aurora. Vicky tells Martín goodbye.

Martín also manages to revive Aurora's godmother, Pasion Urquijo. He uses an alias so Aurora does not know about his involvement, but Pasion eventually finds out his identity. The two form a close friendship and she encourages him to go after Vicky.

Martín has a change of heart and goes to visit Vicky at her family's summer house. They are about to make love when Vicky changes her mind and tells Martín she will only sleep with him when he is completely over Aurora. Christian kisses Vicky to help make Martín jealous and she plays along. Martín in turn invites Diana to make Vicky jealous. Diana observes how bothered Martín is when Vicky is with Christian and tells him he has fallen in love with Vicky without even realizing it. Martín profusely denies this, he says that since Vicky has no memory, therefore she is not her real self and that once she regains her memory she will have no feelings for him. He already fell in love with someone who does not exact (Aurora) and does not want to go through all that suffering again; he begs Diana to help him forget about her.

Things between Martín and Vicky are further complicated by Lorenzo's friend, Ernesto, who is in love with Vicky. Vicky tells Martín she plans on sleeping with Ernesto (Ernesto lied to Vicky that they had slept together before). Martín realizes he is not in love with Aurora anymore and rushes to stop Vicky, but he sees her kissing Ernesto and changes his mind. However, she ends up not going through with it.

Gustavo informs Martín that he may lose the clinic, which means they won't be able to help Pasion, Aurora, and Vicky who may develop illnesses from being frozen. Martín agrees to get his inheritance. He asks to Diana to marry him and she happily agrees.  It seems like all hope is lost for Martín and Vicky. Martín is informed he cannot get his inheritance if he marries someone who is divorced, which Diana is. Martín reluctantly agrees to marry Vicky, but he makes her that their marriage is business deal and they are free to see other people.

Despite some interference from Diana, the wedding goes ahead. Martín realizes he wants to be with Vicky and they make love. Vicky regains her memory the next morning, but, to Martín's relief, she is still in love with him.

Tragedy strikes Martín's family again when Natalia is violently raped by a group of man. Cesar, Lorenzo, and Martín go after the men. There is a struggle and one man accidentally falls off a roof and dies. Neither do they know that this is caught on tape and it appears Lorenzo had pushed him.

Eight months later, Vicky and Martín are still happily married. Aurora and Lorenzo are married and have a baby named Aurora. Martin now runs Gustavo's clinic. Everything is going well for Martin and his family.

On the opening night of the musical Aurora, which stars Vicky, tragedy strikes yet again. Aurora is involved in a car accident and is killed. Martín later has to remove Aurora's heart so it can be transplanted after Gustavo couldn't do it. He is deeply affected by this.

Lorenzo Lobos
Lorenzo Lobos is portrayed by Jorge Luis Pila. He is portrayed by Eugenio Siller in flashbacks.

Lorenzo is the first love of Aurora. He is kind, compassionate, and extremely devoted to his family. Lorenzo had his son Martín when he was fairly young. Martín's mother, Veronica LaSalle, was a wealthy girl who left her family to live with Lorenzo. Veronica eventually left him and Martín to be with a wealthy man.

In 1990, Lorenzo is out dancing in a club one night and meets a young dancer named Aurora Ponce De León. It is love at first sight and they begin a brief, but unforgettable romance.

Aurora keeps Lorenzo secret from her parents as she knew they wouldn't approve of her being with someone below her social class and doesn't tell Lorenzo she is wealthy, because of what Martín's mother did. Vanessa, Aurora's best friend who is also in love with him, invites Lorenzo to Aurora's birthday party where he misinterprets a forced kiss between Aurora and Federico Álvarez De Toledo. Believing he has been betrayed, he breaks up with Aurora. Aurora finds out she is pregnant shortly afterward but Lorenzo is never informed of this. Lorenzo has not heard from Aurora for several months when he gets a phone call from her where she says "I will always love you," then he hears a monitor flat lining and all the commotion. Lorenzo learns that Aurora has been frozen in a cryogenic capsule.

Twenty years later, Lorenzo has been married to Aurora's other best friend, Natalia, for fifteen years and has two more children, Cesar, who he and Natalia adopted, and Nina. He also has a successful career as a dance instructor at New York School of the Arts. Lorenzo is genuinely happy with his family, but Aurora is always in the back of his mind.

Lorenzo is not happy when Martín gets a job Gustavo's clinic because he knows that is where Aurora is. Martín tells his father that he has fallen in love with a patient at the clinic. Lorenzo is shocked when he finds out it is Aurora. However he is later told by Martín that the woman is actually Aurora's daughter also named Aurora. Lorenzo thinks that Aurora might be his daughter but she guarantees him she is not. Aurora tries to seduce Lorenzo repeatedly, he turns her down at first but eventually gives into temptation. Before they are able to make love, Aurora becomes ill and nearly dies.

Aurora begins to create problems between Martín and Lorenzo. Martín tells Lorenzo that he wants him to leave Aurora alone so the two of them can be together, but Lorenzo admits that he has fallen in love with her. To escape his feelings, Lorenzo decides to leave for a new life in Spain with Cesar and Natalia. At the airport, Blanca tells Lorenzo he is her father. Lorenzo questions who Blanca's mother is and Blanca says it is Aurora's mother, Inés. Lorenzo claims that this is impossible, because he never slept with Ines. Blanca begs Lorenzo to stay, but he decides to go. The plane they were supposed to board crashes and they are believed dead by their family, who are overjoyed when they appear safe and sound.

Everyone believes the lie that Inés is Blanca's mother, even though Lorenzo profusely denies sleeping with her. Lorenzo realizes his marriage to Natalia is over and he leaves her. Lorenzo is shocked when a DNA test proves that Blanca is his daughter and reacts rather coldly, since he still does not know how it could be possible.

Lorenzo's Aurora is reanimated, so it appears. Lorenzo is thrilled to have his first love back. Neither does he know that Aurora has taken on two identities is being manipulated by her stepmother, Elizabeth, into having relationships with Lorenzo, as herself, and with Martin, as her daughter. Natalia reveals she is pregnant, which turns out to be a lie, and Lorenzo agrees to be there for her. Lorenzo also finds out that Blanca is in fact his and Aurora's daughter.

Aurora starts acting strange and distant. Lorenzo is heartbroken when she reveals she has fallen in love with Martín. Lorenzo says it was inevitable but Martín states that he is in love with her daughter and does not want anything with his father's soul mate.

Martín's mother, Veronica, reappears in their lives. She is on the run from a gangster and needs help. Lorenzo agrees to help her, but soon the whole family is put in danger. Cesar ends up killing the gangster, Francisco Perez, in self-defense.

Eventually the reason for Aurora's strange behavior comes out: there isn't two Auroras, just one, Lorenzo's Aurora. In retaliation, Cesar and Blanca are kidnapped by Perez's widow, Catalina Perez-Quintana, who is also Vanessa's mother. While trying to rescue them, Lorenzo is shot in the leg. His surgery is successful and Lorenzo won't need an amputation. Unfortunately, Cesar is supposedly murdered by Catalina, devastating Lorenzo.

Lorenzo tells Martín that his Aurora died, so he is not hurt by all the lies, but Vanessa tells him the truth. Martín decides he needs space from his family. Lorenzo and Aurora decide to live together with Blanca so they can be family, but decide it's best not to have a relationship since they don't want to hurt Martín.

One year later, Aurora and Lorenzo still maintain a platonic relationship. Aurora has found an abandoned baby named Tommy. Lorenzo and Aurora pretend to be engaged so they can adopt the baby, though it is clear they both wish it were real.

With Martín's blessing, Aurora and Lorenzo finally reunite. They decide to marry, to the delight of their family. However, their wedding is interrupted by Federico who announces Martín is dying. Everybody rushes to Martín. Aurora disappears with Tommy and her dog, Lucero. On top of this, Nina has been badly beaten and Lorenzo is disgusted to find out she has been working as a prostitute.

After searching for a few hours, they find Aurora living with a family. Aurora tells Lorenzo she feels responsible for all the bad that things have happened and ends her relationship with him.

Aurora finds out she is ill due to the effects from the cryogenics, but she decides not tell anyone. Aurora and Lorenzo go on a romantic trip together and agree to split up for good when they come home. Lorenzo changes his mind and wants to get back together. Aurora realizes she should enjoy the rest of her life and reunites with Lorenzo.

Martín tells Lorenzo that his deceased twin brother, Sebastian, is actually his biological father. Lorenzo is devastated and refuses to believe that Martín is not his son. When Martín questions Lorenzo about Sebastian's murder, he admits that he and Sebastian did not have a good relationship and that he was the last person with him, but he did not kill him. Lorenzo declares that nothing has changed for him, Martín is still his son, to which Martín agrees. Martín sees his true paternity as a good thing, because it means they are not a father and son who fell in love with the same woman.

Daniela, Tommy's nanny, tells Aurora's family about her illness and they all promise to stick by her. Tommy's biological father comes into the picture. Aurora and Lorenzo are heartbroken when they have to hand the baby over. They are asked to be Tommy's godparents and they agree.

Daniela confesses she is in love with Lorenzo. Daniela repeatedly tries to seduce Lorenzo, to his disgust. Aurora misinterprets several moments between Lorenzo and Daniela and their relationship is strained. Lorenzo goes to a hotel room believing he is meeting Aurora, but Daniela is behind it. Aurora catches them together and kicks Lorenzo out. Eventually Daniela's manipulations are exposed and Lorenzo and Aurora agree to never let anything come between them again.

When Natalia is brutally raped by the same group of man who attacked Nina, Lorenzo swears revenge. Lorenzo, Cesar, and Martín go after the men. There is a struggle and one man accidentally falls off a roof and dies. Neither do they know that this is caught on tape and it appears Lorenzo had pushed him.

Aurora and Lorenzo are thrilled when they find out she is pregnant. They get married in a private ceremony.

Eights months later, Aurora gives birth to a beautiful baby girl, who they name Aurora. Lorenzo and Aurora's happiness is complete.

The highly anticipated musical Aurora based on Aurora's life and directed by Lorenzo is opening. Aurora decides to stay home with the baby. The baby becomes ill and Aurora decides to take her to the hospital. The paparazzi pursue her while she drives wanting to get a picture of her daughter. Aurora's car crashes and she is rushed to Gustavo's clinic.

Unfortunately, there is no hope for Aurora. After telling Lorenzo she wants him to move on with his life, she peacefully passes away. Lorenzo declares his heart will be hers forever.

Aurora had requested that her heart be donated and, in another hospital, it is given to a woman named Angela Amenabar. At Aurora's funeral, Lorenzo is arrested for the murder of the man who feel off the roof.

Blanca Ponce De León
Blanca Ponce De León is portrayed by Lisette Morelos.

Blanca is the daughter of Lorenzo and Aurora. Her mother became very ill shortly after her birth and was frozen in a cryogenic capsule and her father was never informed of her existence. She was raised believing her grandparents were her parents and Aurora was her sister. She has been best friends with Vicky Hutton since they were young.

Blanca is feisty, fun-loving, and spoiled. She always believed her parents loved Aurora more than her and, as result, she always hated Aurora, who she nicknamed "la congelada" (the frozen one).

Aurora is reanimated by Gustavo, but when they meet, Blanca is told that the woman is not her "sister" Aurora but that she is Aurora's long-lost daughter, also named Aurora. Blanca immediately hates her "niece" since she looks exactly like Aurora. However, after talking with Martín Lobos, Blanca decides she wants to get to know her long-lost niece.

Blanca becomes attracted to Martín, who is actually her half-brother, but also begins flirtation with Martín's adopted brother, Cesar. Cesar kidnaps Blanca out of jealousy. He wears a mask so she does not know who her assailant is. She is rescued by Martin, Lorenzo, and Aurora. Blanca thanks Martín by kissing him. She is hurt when Martín tells her he is in love with Aurora and just wants to be friends. Aurora tells Blanca that Martin is her brother. Blanca asks Gustavo if this is true and he denies it. But when Blanca states a desire to have a relationship with Martín, Gustavo becomes enraged and threatens to kill Martin. Aurora later explains that Lorenzo is Blanca's father. Blanca is horrified to realize that means that her "sister," Aurora, could be her mother, but Aurora lies and says that Inés is mother.

When Blanca catches Martín and Aurora in intimate moment, she thinks that Aurora lied about her paternity to so she could have Martín for herself and their relationship is strained again. However, Blanca's claim proves not to be the case because the DNA test proves that Martín is in fact her brother. Martín and Blanca are happy with the results and Blanca gives Martín and Aurora her blessing. Blanca tells Lorenzo she is his daughter and is heartbroken when he reacts coldly.

Cesar spend more time together though they can barely stand each other and often end up fighting. Blanca is angered when her "sister" Aurora is reanimated. The truth finally comes out that Aurora is her mother and she sees her in a different light.

Blanca is saddened when she discovers that Cesar and Vicky's mother, Vanessa, are sleeping together. Still, she agrees to keep it a secret from everybody. Upon hearing that her mother ended her relationship with her father because she is in love with Martín, she wants nothing to with her mother again.

After many ups and downs, Blanca and Cesar finally admit they are in love with each other. Cesar asks Blanca to marry him and they elope. While trying to protect his family, Cesar kills gangster, Francisco Perez. In retaliation, Cesar and Blanca are kidnapped by Francisco's widow, Catalina Perez- Quintana, who is also Vanessa's mother. Blanca is rescued but Cesar is supposedly murdered.

A year later, Blanca is still heartbroken over Cesar's death, but having her friends and family has been a great comfort. Blanca misses Martín, who had left after Cesar funeral, and manages to track him down, but he isn't ready to come home. Neither doe she know her brother is keeping a big secret from her: Cesar is still alive.

Blanca sees Cesar at his own burial place, but he runs off. No one believes her when she says he is alive. She knows Cesar is watching her and flirts with another man to make him jealous. Cesar is taken hostage Perez's brother, Saverio. Blanca and her family go to rescue him and Blanca is shocked when Saverio's daughter, Ingrid, kisses Cesar and claims she is in love with him. Blanca is furious, but Cesar explains that it was a set-up to have him released. He confesses to sleeping with Vanessa after seeing her flirting, but Blanca forgives him.

They still are not out of harm's way. The reason Cesar disappeared was part of deal he and Martín made with Catalina: Vicky, who is Catalina's granddaughter, was poisoned a year earlier and had to be frozen, Martín would find a cure for her and, in exchange, Cesar's life would be spared.

Blanca is thrilled when her parents decide to get married. She gives a touching speech at the wedding, but it is interrupted when Federico arrives and announces Martín is dying. Blanca and her family rush to Martín, who eventually recovers. Aurora disappears for a while but is eventually found. Martin manages to reanimate Vicky and Blanca is happy to have her dear friend back.

Vanessa Miller
Vanessa Miller is portrayed by Aylin Mujica. She is portrayed by Vanessa Pose in flashbacks. She is the principal villain of the series.

Vanessa is the mother of Vicky and Arturo and the daughter of Catalina Perez-Quintana and an unknown man. She was raised by her mother's first husband, Ignacio Miller. She adored her father and was never close to her mother. Vanessa is glamorous, calculating, and bitchy, but she has moments of kindness and vulnerability.

In 1990, young Vanessa attended New York School of the Arts along with her two best friends, Natalia Suarez and Aurora Ponce De Leon. She falls in love with Lorenzo Lobos, who is dating Aurora. She decides to break them up. She maliciously invites Lorenzo to Aurora's birthday party where she sets it up so Lorenzo sees Aurora being forcibly kissed by Federico Alvarez de Toledo. The plan works and Lorenzo breaks up with Aurora. Neither does Vanessa know that what she has done will permanently change the lives of everyone...

Twenty years later, Vanessa is a world-famous telenovela actress and revels in her fame. She is in a loveless marriage with Eduardo Hutton and has a daughter, Victoria (Vicky), who she absolutely adores. Vicky is best friends with Aurora and Lorenzo's daughter, Blanca, so she still is connected to the Ponce De Leon family. She has not spoken to Natalia in twenty years. She is shocked and angered when she meets Natalia's daughter, Nina, and finds out that Natalia married Lorenzo, who she still hasn't gotten over.

Cesar Lobos
Cesar Lobos is portrayed by Pablo Azar. The character was originally meant to be a villain, but he proved popular with viewers and they made the character a hero.

Cesar is the adopted son of Lorenzo and Natalia. He is sarcastic, cunning, and bad tempered. He is also a criminal and a gang member, but he loves his family very much and would do anything for them. He was left as baby in an orphanage and was adopted by his parents when he was 7 years old. His abandonment made him extremely resentful.

When the story begins, Cesar is in prison for theft. When he is released, his family is thrilled to have him back. He meets Blanca and is immediately drawn to her. Blanca is more interested in his brother, Martín, who she is unaware is actually her half-brother. Cesar is jealous and decides to kidnap Blanca with the help of his fellow gang members. One night when they are out together he kidnaps her and brings her to a warehouse. He wears a mask so Blanca does not know who her assailant is. Blanca is rescued by Martín, Lorenzo, and Aurora. It is believed that Blanca's kidnapper died in a fire. However, Lorenzo suspects that Cesar was the kidnapper, but he denies it, and Lorenzo believes him.

Cesar and his parents decide to start a new life in Spain. Cesar is shocked when Blanca stops them at the airport and announces that Lorenzo is her father. She begs Lorenzo to stay, but Lorenzo decides they should leave. Their plane crashes and they are feared dead by their family. They never board the plane, though, and return home safe and sound. They decide to stay in New York after all.

Cesar begins a torrid affair with Vanessa Miller, they have a children Arturo. Vanessa's daughter, Vicky, has a huge crush on him, but he is not the least bit interested in her. Cesar and Blanca spend more and more time together, but they mostly argue and throw insults at each other. Vanessa and Cesar are nearly caught out several times, but manage to keep their affair secret. Blanca walks in on them, but agrees to keep it quiet.

Cesar and Vanessa's affair turns volatile and he ends it. Cesar goes to Miami for a few weeks and eventually runs into Blanca. They finally admit their love each other. They return to New York together. Cesar asks Blanca to marry him and they elope. Cesar and Blanca have twins Simon and Santiago.

Martín nearly dies after a fight with Federico Alvarez de Toledo, who is already Cesar's enemy. Cesar kidnaps him and beats him badly. As he is about to kill Federico he receives word that Martín will recover and changes his mind. Federico is left blind in one eye and swears revenge.

Cesar's family is put in danger when Martín's biological mother, Veronica, comes into their lives. She is on the run from a gangster named Francisco Perez and needs help. Lorenzo and Veronica both end up kidnapped and, while rescuing them, Cesar ends up killing Perez. Blanca finds out that Cesar kidnapped her, but decides to forgive him.

In retaliation, Cesar and Blanca are kidnapped by Francisco's widow, Catalina Perez- Quintana, who is also Vanessa's mother. Blanca is rescued while Cesar is held hostage. With permission from Catalina, Federico beats Cesar severely. Martín finds him and it appears he has died from his injuries. His heartbroken family holds a funeral for him.

One year later, it revealed Cesar is still alive and has been hiding out in Europe. In exchange for Cesar's safety, Martín has agreed to find a cure for Vicky, who is also Catalina's granddaughter and who is frozen in cryogenic capsule after being poisoned.

Gustavo Ponce De León
Gustavo Ponce De León is portrayed by Braulio Castillo.

Gustavo is the father of Aurora and grandfather of Blanca. He is a brilliant doctor with a successful cryogenics lab, but he is often cold, controlling, and overly protective of his family. He did not approve of Aurora's relationship with Lorenzo and sends her away when it is discovered she is pregnant. When Aurora becomes deathly ill and dies, he freezes her in a cryogenic capsule in the hope he will one day find a cure.

Twenty years later, Gustavo still desperately misses his daughter and has not given up on bringing her back. He and Inés are now divorced, their marriage having fallen apart due to the strain of Aurora's "death." His clinic is still successful and he tries to be a good father to Aurora's daughter, Blanca.

Federico Álvarez De Toledo
Federico Álvarez De Toledo is portrayed by Ismael La Rosa.

Federico is the former fiancée of Aurora Ponce De León. They were never in love and were pushed together by their parents. He is evil, conniving, and insensitive.

In 1990, at Aurora's twentieth birthday party, Federico and Vanessa Miller arrange it so that Aurora's boyfriend, Lorenzo Lobos, witnesses a kiss between him and Aurora. The plan works and Lorenzo breaks up with Aurora.

Twenty years later, Federico is still connected to the Ponce De León family.

Natalia Suarez
Natalia Suarez is portrayed by Sandra Destenave. She is portrayed by Talina Duclaud in flashbacks.

Natalia is Nina's mother and the adoptive mother of Cesar and Martín. She is loving, impulsive, and extremely dedicated to her family. She was best friends with Aurora and Vanessa growing up and they attended New York School of the Arts together. She had an affair with Aurora's father, Gustavo, as a teenager and fell in love with him. When Gustavo ended their affair she sought comfort from her friend, Ernesto, and became pregnant with Nina. Since they were not in love she decided it was best to raise Nina by herself, which Ernesto agreed to, though they remained friends.

Twenty years after Aurora was frozen, Natalia has been married to Aurora true love, Lorenzo Lobos, for fifteen years and has two adopted sons, Martín and Cesar. Natalia always believed that Lorenzo was still in love with Aurora and that he only married her to provide a family for their children, but the two have a loving relationship.

Natalia is horrified when Aurora's supposed long-lost daughter who looks exactly like Aurora and is also named Aurora comes into their lives.

After a year of Natalia is again Aurorina's friend  and loves Gustavo. When Gustavo decide of Elizabeth, Elizabeth tries to kill Natalia, but Cesar to prevents.

Inés Ponce De León
Inés Ponce De León is portrayed by Karen Sentíes.

Inés is Aurora's mother and Blanca's grandmother. Inés was a doting mother to Aurora and did not like the way Gustavo controlled her. She was devastated when Aurora was frozen and her marriage to Gustavo eventually fell apart.

Twenty years after Aurora's "death," Inés is a successful businesswoman and has tried to be the best mother she can be to Aurora's daughter, Blanca, who she raised as her own daughter. She had an affair with Vanessa Miller's husband, Eduardo Hutton, which caused her much shame. Inés is overwhelmed with joy when Gustavo reanimates Aurora. She is reluctant to reunite Aurora and Blanca because she is worried that Aurora will be hurt by Blanca's hatred for her.

Ernesto Podesta
Ernesto Podesta is portrayed by Melvin Cabrera.

Ernesto is Lorenzo's best friend. He is Natalia's former lover and the biological father of her daughter, Nina. He and Natalia decided it was best that Nina be raised only by her, with Ernesto as her godfather. Ernesto watched his daughter grow up but never told her or anyone else he was her father.

Ernesto is a dance instructor at New York School of the Arts. He is also a former sex addict and runs a support group.

Vicky Hutton
Victoria "Vicky" Hutton is portrayed by Vanessa Pose.

Vicky is the daughter of Eduardo Hutton and Vanessa Miller. She is Arturo's sister. She is rather innocent, sweet, and nothing like her mother, though they have a close relationship. She has been best friends with Blanca Ponce De León since they were young. Following in her mother's footsteps, she is a dancer at New York School of the Arts.

At school she forms a friendship with Nina Lobos. Vicky develops a crush on Nina's brother, Cesar. Out of her friends, Vicky is the only level headed one and often points out when something is ridiculous. She is also more conservative than her friends, choosing to wait until marriage to have sex. Vicky's crush develops and she falls head over heels in love with Cesar, but he is in love with Blanca. When Blanca and Cesar get married, Vicky is genuinely happy for them and decides to move on with her life. When confiding in Ernesto, she is shocked when he declares his love for her and she runs off. Vicky is poisoned by Elizabeth, who actually intended to poison Vanessa. There is no cure for her and she is frozen in a cryogenic capsule until one can be found.

Dr. Martín Lobos manages to find a cure for Vicky and she is successfully reanimated. Vicky wakes up with no memory and falls instantly in love with Martín. Vicky repeatedly tries to seduce Martín, but he turns her down. Vicky becomes rivals with Martín's lover, Diana del Valle, for his love. Martín is left an inheritance by his maternal grandfather, which he can only get if he is married. Vicky enthusiastically offers to marry him, but Martin declines the inheritance. Vicky is miserable when she moves back in with her mother, but eventually starts to feel more comfortable and forms a close friendship with her grandmother's godson, Christian Santana.

Vicky and Martín have spent a lot of time together and have become very close. It is clear Martín has started to fall for her too. Vicky tells Martín she does not have any expectations, she just wants to be with him. Martín tells Vicky he is never going to fall in love again because he is going to be in love with his first love, Aurora. Vicky decides it is best that her and Martín part ways.

Vicky is thrilled when Martín visits her at her family's summer house, where she went to help regain her memory. They are about to make love when Vicky changes her mind and tells Martín she will only sleep with him when he is completely over Aurora. Vicky plays along when Christian kisses her so she can make Martín jealous. Martin in turn makes Vicky jealous with Diana. Diana rubs in Vicky's face her beauty and relationship with Martín; this along with finding Martín in bed with Diana makes Vicky feel like she should just give up.

Ernesto wants to be with Vicky. He previously told her they had never slept together before she was frozen, but lies and says they did. Vicky decides to sleep with Ernesto to forget about Martín. However, she cannot go through with it. Vicky is ecstatic when Martín decides to get his inheritance. She hopes that he will ask her to marry him, but he asks Diana. Vicky is heartbroken and feels like all hope is lost until it is revealed that Martín can't marry someone who is divorced, which Diana is. After much convincing, Martín agrees to marry Vicky. Martín wants the marriage to be only a business deal. Vicky agrees and they get married.

They eventually fall madly in love with each other and Vicky also regained her old memories back. 
She is kidnapped by Ernesto, who is crazily in love with her and  acid is thrown in her face but Martin saves her, they have two children together Martin and Victoria,

Nina Lobos
Nina Lobos is portrayed by Talina Duclaud.

Nina is the daughter of Ernesto and Natalia. Her parents agreed that Ernesto would not be involved in Nina's upbringing and she was later adopted by her stepfather, Lorenzo Lobos. Nina was never informed of her true paternity and always believed her biological father had abandoned her. She is selfish, manipulative, and can be rather nasty, but she is also desperately lonely and craves attention. She absolutely adores her parents and her brothers, Martín and Cesar, though she can be rather neglectful towards them.
 
Nina, like her parents, is a dancer and attends New York School of the Arts. Though they grew up together, Nina has always been in love with her adoptive brother, Martín, and she refuses to acknowledge him as her brother. Martín, however, does not reciprocate her feelings. She becomes friends with Blanca and Vicky at school. She is furious when Martín falls in love with Aurora and decides she has to act fast. She pretends to be a stripper at a party that Martín and Cesar are attending. Martín does not recognize her since she is wearing a mask and the two have sex. Nina is thrilled to have finally been with the man she loves but when she reveals her identity, Martín is disgusted, leaving her heartbroken. When the other members of her family find out about their one night stand, they are also disgusted and tell Nina she needs to forget about Martín, but she refuses.

Nina is disgusted by Aurora's presence in their lives. She blames her for stealing Martín from her and ruining her parents' marriage. Nina is shocked when Aurora reveals that Natalia had an affair with her father, Gustavo. Nina is horrified to realize that Gustavo could be her father and begs Natalia to finally tell her who her father is. She is shocked to the core when Natalia reveals it is her godfather, Ernesto.

Elizabeth Oviedo
Dr. Elizabeth Oviedo is portrayed by Monica Franco.

Dr. Elizabeth Oviedo is a doctor at Gustavo's clinic. She is evil, conniving, and psychotic. She murders or attempts to murder people who try to get in her way or pose threat to her. Elizabeth is married with Gustavo and becomes crazy. Gustavo is thrown from the clinic, with this she becomes enraged, and she wants to go to Aurora, but shortly pierces Lorenzo. Gustavo is led to the jail, but was released. Elizabeth threatened Gustavo because he wanted to confess the truth. She arranges a meeting with Martin and leaves behind a toxic food to poison him. Not a few time later, she comes to Natalia and wants to kill her. By luck, Cesar appears which help Natalia avoid the poisoned food. He then informs her that his mother, Elizabeth was taken to the madhouse. After a while she leaves with clinic, cured, and becomes a good person. Elizabeth wants to help Vicky from the kidnapping and takes off her scar from the face. He learns that Vicky was abducted and went to her help. Then comes Cesar and Martin to Ernesto's to kill Elizabeth.

Roque
Roque is portrayed by Rubén Morales.

Roque is the chauffeur for the Ponce De León family. He is also a friend and confidant for the family and is especially close to Aurora. Falls in love with Ines and they marry. Gets a job out of town and along with Ines go.

Dr. Williams
Dr. Williams is portrayed by Miguel Augusto Rodríguez.

Dr. Williams is a doctor at Gustavo's clinic. It was revealed he is gay when he declares his love for Gustavo. Gustavo was shocked by this revelation, but allowed Dr. Williams to continue working at the clinic. For the most part he gets along well with the other doctors and patients. He did however conspire to kill Dr. Liliana Rosales and is repeatedly in conflict with Elizabeth, who even tried to kill him.

Liliana Rosales
Dr. Liliana Rosales is portrayed by Carla Rodriguez.

Dr. Liliana Rosales is a doctor at Gustavo's clinic. Has a relationship with Martin. He learns that the Aurora was alive all the time. Elizabeth is locked in a room but she manages to escape. Elizabeth finds the clinic on the roof and pushed from the balcony. Liliana dies on the spot.

Catalina Perez-Quintana
Catalina Perez-Quintana is portrayed by Zully Montero.

Catalina is the mother of Vanessa and grandmother of Vicky and Arturo. She runs a prostitution ring and is involved several other criminal activities. She was married to Ignacio Miller, who had an affair with Pasion Urquijo. This made Catalina a bitter woman and she set out to destroy Pasion's life. She did this by stealing Pasion and Ignacio's son at birth and making Pasion believe he had died. In reality, Catalina gave their son to the Santana family, he was named Christian and Catalina became his godmother. Despite her hatred for Pasion, Catalina loves Christian like a son and even funded his education.

Pasion Urquijo
Pasion Urquijo is portrayed by Angélica María.

Pasion is a world-famous actress and singer and the beloved godmother of Aurora. The two always had an extremely close bond. This bond made Aurora's mother, Inés, resent Pasion, who she believed Aurora loved more than her. Pasion had a long affair with Ignacio Miller, who was the love of her life. She had a son with him who she believed died at birth. Her son was actually stolen by Catalina and given to the Santana family, who named him Christian. The loss of her son devastated Pasion; she believed it was punishment for her affair and success as an entertainer. Years later, Pasion became ill and was frozen in a cryogenic capsule. Just months later, her goddaughter, Aurora, was frozen as well.

Many years later, Dr. Martín Lobos finds a cure for Pasion and reanimates her. Pasion can't believe so much time has passed and believes this even more so when she is reunited with Aurora, who looks exactly the same. Aurora explains everything that happened to her and it is clear their bond is still strong. Martín uses an alias with Pasion as he does not want Aurora to find out about his involvement. Pasion takes a strong liking to Martín and wants to know more about him. Blanca reveals to Pasion who Martín really is and about his situations with Vicky and Aurora. Martín and Pasion develop a close friendship and she encourages him to move on from Aurora and be with Vicky, who she believes is his true love.

Clara Amenabar
Clara Amenabar is portrayed by Carolina Tejera.

Angela's sister, in love with Christian.

Christian Santana
Christian Santana is portrayed by David Chocarro.

Christian is a veterinarian, godson of Catalina, and the biological son of Pasion Urquijo and Ignacio Miller. He was stolen at birth by Catalina and given to the Santana family. Christian was always aware that Pasion was his mother, but Catalina told him that Pasion had abandoned him because her career was more important to her, which was a lie. Catalina and Christian have a close relationship and she even paid for his education. Christian wants to go because it is in love with Vicky but his mind and decides to stay. Christian finds out what the Catalina. Just forgive her when she tries to kill. Falls in love with Nina, and two of them together with Pasion go along.

References

Aurora
Aurora